is a railway station on the Sekihoku Main Line in Ōzora, Hokkaido, Japan, operated by Hokkaido Railway Company (JR Hokkaido). It is located at the southern end of Lake Abashiri.

Lines
The station is numbered A67.

Station layout

The station consists of two opposed side platforms serving two tracks. The station is unstaffed, but has toilet facilities.

Platforms

Adjacent stations

History
The station opened on October 5, 1912.

A new station building was completed in 1990. The station became unstaffed from June 1, 1993.

Surrounding area
 Ōzora Town Hall
 Lake Abashiri (a three-minute walk)
 Memanbetsu Onsen
 National Route 39

References

External links

 JR Hokkaido station information 

Railway stations in Hokkaido Prefecture
Railway stations in Japan opened in 1912